Moraxella equi is a Gram-negative bacterium in the genus  Moraxella, which was isolated from the eye of a horse.

References

External links
Type strain of Moraxella equi at BacDive -  the Bacterial Diversity Metadatabase

Moraxellaceae
Bacteria described in 1970